Martina Ritter (born 23 September 1982) is an Austrian former racing cyclist. She competed in the 2013 UCI women's road race in Florence. She won the Austrian National Road Race Championships in 2015 and 2017 and she was six times national time trial champion.

It was initially announced that Ritter had retired from competition at the end of that year, but she contested the 2019 Gracia–Orlová, finishing ninth overall for an Austrian national team. She retired at the end of the season.

Major results

2012
 National Road Championships
2nd Road race
2nd Time trial
 2nd Memorial Davide Fardelli
 3rd Overall Tour de Feminin-O cenu Českého Švýcarska
2013
 National Road Championships
1st  Time trial
2nd Road race
 3rd Overall Tour de Feminin – O cenu Ceského Švýcarska
 9th Chrono Champenois – Trophée Européen
2014
 National Road Championships
1st  Time trial
3rd Road race
 1st Nagrada Ljubljane TT
 2nd Overall Auensteiner–Radsporttage
 5th GP du Canton d'Argovie
 7th Overall Gracia-Orlová
2015
 National Road Championships
1st  Road race
1st  Time trial
 5th Time trial, European Games
 5th Overall Tour de Feminin-O cenu Českého Švýcarska
 5th Chrono Champenois
 6th Overall Auensteiner–Radsporttage
 8th Overall Thüringen Rundfahrt der Frauen
 8th GP du Canton d'Argovie
 10th Ljubljana–Domžale–Ljubljana TT
2016
 National Road Championships
1st  Time trial
2nd Road race
 6th La Classique Morbihan
 10th Overall Giro della Toscana Int. Femminile – Memorial Michela Fanini
 10th Ljubljana–Domžale–Ljubljana TT
2017
 National Road Championships
1st  Road race
1st  Time trial
 4th Overall Gracia–Orlová
1st Stage 4
 4th Overall Tour Cycliste Féminin International de l'Ardèche
 5th Time trial, UEC European Road Championships
 9th Overall Tour of California
 Combativity award, Stage 3 The Women's Tour
2018
 1st  Time trial, National Road Championships
2019
 6th Ljubljana–Domžale–Ljubljana TT
 9th Overall Gracia–Orlová

References

External links

1982 births
Living people
Austrian female cyclists
Sportspeople from Linz
Cyclists at the 2015 European Games
European Games competitors for Austria
Cyclists at the 2016 Summer Olympics
Olympic cyclists of Austria
21st-century Austrian women